Articles on Long Island Railroad include:

 Long Island Rail Road
 History of the Long Island Rail Road
 List of Long Island Rail Road stations